"Pearl Necklace" is a song by ZZ Top from their 1981 album El Loco. The song went to No. 28 on the Billboard Rock Tracks chart in 1981 but was never released as a single.

"Pearl Necklace" was produced by Bill Ham, and recorded and mixed by Terry Manning.

Song information
The song contains double entendre lyrics which refer to a sexual act called a "pearl necklace", as intimated in the chorus: "She was gettin' bombed and I was gettin' blown away", and ultimately revealed in the final verse: "And that's not jewelry she's talkin' about - it really don't cost that much."

Charts

Personnel
Billy Gibbons - guitar, vocals
Dusty Hill - bass
Frank Beard - drums

References

ZZ Top songs
Songs written by Frank Beard (musician)
Songs written by Dusty Hill
Songs written by Billy Gibbons
1981 songs
Song recordings produced by Bill Ham